"Aerials" is a song by American heavy metal band System of a Down. It was released in 2002 from their second album Toxicity, which earned the band its second Grammy Award nomination for Best Hard Rock Performance in 2003.

The song hit number one on both the Billboard Alternative Songs and Mainstream Rock chart. It was System of a Down's first number-one hit.

Music video
The music video was directed by Shavo Odadjian and David Slade. The video features an alien-like, disfigured boy who is accompanied by people in various settings. Video was shot in Hollywood, Los Angeles.

As of January 2023, the song has 390 million views on YouTube.

Reception
"Aerials" is widely considered one of the band's best songs. Loudwire and Kerrang both ranked the song number three on their lists of the greatest System of a Down songs.

Track listing

Charts

Certifications

References

System of a Down songs
2002 singles
2001 songs
Music videos directed by David Slade
Song recordings produced by Rick Rubin
Songs written by Daron Malakian
Songs written by Serj Tankian